Siderurgistul Stadium is a multi-use stadium in Galaţi, Romania, built in early 2000s.  It is currently used mostly for football matches and is the home ground of Oţelul Galaţi youth squads. The stadium holds about 6,000 people.

Football venues in Romania
Buildings and structures in Galați
ASC Oțelul Galați